Enrique Triverio (born December 31, 1988) is an Argentine professional footballer who plays as a forward for The Strongest.

Club career

Deportivo Toluca
On 26 May 2015, Enrique Triverio agreed to a three-year deal with Liga MX team Deportivo Toluca. Triverio made his official debut for Deportivo Toluca in a 0–1 win against Tigres UANL in the Universitario Stadium. In the 6th minute of his debut he scored the goal that would give the team the first three points.

On 13 March 2017, Triverio was given a one-year ban by the Mexico Football Federation for having pushed referee Miguel Ángel Flores in the chest.
On March 10 he was first handed an eight-match ban, but the decision was handed down just two days later after the Liga MX referees' association (AMA) went on strike to force the cancellation of Liga MX and Copa MX Round 10 matches appalling at the initial consequences for Triverio and Pablo Aguilar from Club América, which refs viewed as too light.
On Monday, the FMF said via a statement that after reviewing the documentation, "the appeals committee has decided to revoke the 'initial' sanctions imposed by the disciplinary committee, and in their place have determined that Triverio and Aguilar shall be sanctioned with a one-year suspension."

References

1988 births
Living people
Argentine footballers
Argentine expatriate footballers
Argentine people of Italian descent
Sportspeople from Santa Fe Province
Association football forwards
Argentine Primera División players
Primera Nacional players
Torneo Argentino A players
Liga MX players
Gimnasia y Esgrima de Jujuy footballers
Argentinos Juniors footballers
Defensa y Justicia footballers
Unión de Santa Fe footballers
Deportivo Toluca F.C. players
Querétaro F.C. footballers
Racing Club de Avellaneda footballers
The Strongest players
Argentine expatriate sportspeople in Mexico
Argentine expatriate sportspeople in Bolivia
Expatriate footballers in Mexico
Expatriate footballers in Bolivia